Hoani Meihana Te Rangiotū (?–1898) was a notable New Zealand tribal leader and peacemaker. Of Māori descent, he identified with the Rangitāne iwi.

References

1898 deaths
Rangitāne people
New Zealand pacifists
Year of birth missing